Exochi (Greek: Εξοχή meaning "countryside") may refer to several villages in Greece:

Exochi, Achaea, a village in Achaea
Exochi, Drama, a village in the municipality Kato Nevrokopi, Drama regional unit
Exochi, Ioannina, a village in the Ioannina regional unit
Exochi, Kavala, a village in the Kavala regional unit
Exochi, Kozani, a village in the Kozani regional unit
Exochi, Pieria, a village in Pieria
Exochi, Thessaloniki, a village in the Thessaloniki regional unit
Exochi, Xanthi, a village in the Xanthi regional unit